Jolene may refer to:

People
 Jolene (name), a female given name

Music 
 Jolene (band), an American alt-country band
 Jolene (album), an album by Dolly Parton
 "Jolene" (song), a 1973 song  by Dolly Parton
 "Jolene", a song by Hey Ocean! on the 2012 album IS
 "Jolene", a song by Ewert and The Two Dragons on the 2011 album Good Man Down 
 "Jolene", a song by Bob Dylan on the 2009 album Together Through Life
 "Jolene", a song by Ray LaMontagne on the 2004 album Trouble covered on the 2008 album The Foundation by Zac Brown Band
 "Jolene", a song by Cake on the 1994 album Motorcade of Generosity
 "Jolene", a song by The White Stripes on the 2010 album Under Great White Northern Lights
 "Jolene", a trumpet solo by James F. Burke (Musician)

Other uses
 Jolene (film), a 2008 American drama film directed by Dan Ireland
 "Jolene: A Life" a short story by E. L. Doctorow inspired by the Parton song and source material for the Ireland movie